The state funeral of George V, King of the United Kingdom of Great Britain and Ireland and Emperor of India, occurred on 28 January 1936 at St George's Chapel, Windsor Castle, following his death on 20 January and subsequent lying in state at Westminster Hall.

Death

King George had suffered several bouts of serious illness since the First World War; he suffered from chronic bronchitis exacerbated by heavy smoking. By 1935 he required the occasional use of oxygen tanks kept at his bedside. By the end of that year, his personal physician, Lord Dawson of Penn, told the prime minister, Stanley Baldwin, that the king was "packing up his luggage and getting ready to depart".

In the new year of 1936, King George took to his bed at Sandringham House in Norfolk; family members were summoned on 16 and 17 January by an anxious Queen Mary. At 21:25 on Tuesday 20 January, Lord Dawson wrote a press bulletin on the back of a menu card; "the King’s life is moving peacefully to its close". King George died at 23:55 with the queen and his children at his bedside and the Archbishop of Canterbury, Cosmo Lang, reciting prayers. It was revealed decades later from Dawson's account in his personal diary, that he had hastened the process by injecting an overdose of morphine and cocaine into the king's jugular vein, with the intention of having the announcement in the morning broadsheet newspapers, rather than "the less appropriate evening journals".

Sandringham to London

On the afternoon of 22 January, the king's coffin was taken from Sandringham House to the parish church of St Mary Magdalene, where it lay in state overnight with an honour guard of estate workers. On the following morning, 23 January, the coffin was taken in a 2½ mile (4 kilometre) procession from the church to Wolferton railway station, with King Edward VIII and his brothers walking behind and the rest of the royal family in carriages. Also accompanying was the late king's grey pony Jock, led by a groom, and his parrot Charlotte, whose cage was carried by a servant.

The funeral train, hauled by Class B17 locomotive No. 2847 Helmingham Hall, arrived in London at King's Cross railway station and then the coffin was carried on a gun carriage escorted by Grenadier Guards through crowded but silent streets with King Edward and his brothers walking behind, arriving at Westminster Hall at four o'clock. As the coffin was carried into the hall by guardsmen, the Maltese cross which surmounted the Imperial State Crown, fell off and landed in the street; Edward was heard to exclaim "Christ! What's going to happen next?"

Lying in state
Upon entering the hall, the choirs of Westminster Abbey and the Chapel Royal sang Psalm 103; "Praise the Lord, O my soul". A short service was conducted by the Archbishop of Canterbury, which included the hymn, Praise, my soul, the King of heaven, at the suggestion of Queen Mary.

Following the departure of the royal family, Members of Parliament, led by the Lord Chancellor and the Speaker of the House of Commons, were the first to file past the catafalque to pay their respects. They were followed by ordinary members of the public, who formed a queue fifteen deep through the streets of Westminster; during the four days of the lying in state, 809,182 people were recorded to have passed through the hall. Also visiting were royalty and dignitaries from overseas who had arrived in London for the funeral. The doors of the hall were finally closed at 04:00 on Tuesday, 28 January.

Vigil of the Princes
During the lying in state, the catafalque was guarded at all times by twelve men; four Yeomen of the Guard, four Gentlemen-at-Arms, and four officers of the Household Division, either the Foot Guards or the Household Cavalry. The guard was changed every twenty minutes, except for the Yeomen who were relieved every hour.

At midnight, after attending a state dinner at Buckingham Palace for the visiting dignitaries including five kings, the late king's four surviving sons, King Edward VIII, the Duke of York, the Duke of Gloucester, and the Duke of Kent, stood vigil replacing the four guards officers. This event became known as the Vigil of the Princes. They were dressed respectively in the full dress uniforms of the Welsh Guards, the Scots Guards, the 10th Royal Hussars and the Royal Navy. It was reported that many of the passing mourners failed to recognise the princes.

London to Windsor
The funeral procession began at 09:45 on Tuesday, 28 January, with the tolling of Big Ben. The coffin was placed on the Royal Navy State Funeral Gun Carriage, drawn by a team of 142 naval ratings. Following the gun carriage on foot were the king and the Royal Dukes, after which came the kings of Denmark, Norway, Romania, Bulgaria and Belgium, along with the President of France and other dignitaries. The queen, the Princess Royal and the Royal Duchesses travelled in horse-drawn state coaches. The procession was watched by huge crowds along the route, often twelve deep, many of whom had braved overnight rain. Some 150 members of the public had to be taken to hospital and it was reported that first aiders had treated 10,000 cases of fainting. In some places, the crowd had burst through the police cordon, delaying the proceedings by 22 minutes. The route from Westminster Hall passed down Whitehall to Trafalgar Square, under Admiralty Arch into The Mall, turning into St James's Street and then along Piccadilly to Hyde Park Corner. Entering Hyde Park, the procession passed along the East Carriage Road to Marble Arch and from there to Paddington Station via Edgware Road.

On arrival at Paddington Station, the coffin was loaded onto the funeral train, hauled by 4073 Class locomotive No. 4082 Windsor Castle, which left at around midday. A further six special trains carrying dignitaries had preceded it, leaving at 10-minute intervals. At Windsor & Eton railway station, the coffin was transferred to the state gun carriage again and  drawn through the streets of the town towards Windsor Castle, escorted by the Coldstream Guards. At St George's Chapel, sailors used boatswain's calls to signal "Admiral on board" and "Admiral over the side", followed by Highland pipers playing the lament, Flowers of the Forest. The king and his brothers saluted as the coffin was carried up the chapel steps.

Funeral service

The service itself was a fairly simple affair following the text of the Book of Common Prayer and lacking any additional anthems, which had been a feature of other royal funerals. Instead, a congregational hymn, Abide with me, was included. The last funeral sentence, I heard a Voice from Heaven, was sung to a setting by Sir John Goss, rather than the traditional music by William Croft. After the Garter Principal King of Arms had pronounced the style of the late king, God be in my Head by Sir Henry Walford Davies was sung.

Initially interred in the Royal Vault beneath the Quire at St George's Chapel, King George's body was transferred to a monumental sarcophagus in the North Nave Aisle on 27 February 1939. It is surmounted by tomb effigies of George and Mary, sculpted by Sir William Reid Dick (1878–1961). Queen Mary was laid to rest next to her husband following her funeral at St George's on 31 March 1953.

The service was broadcast live on BBC Radio and relayed across the empire; also newsreel films of the funeral processions were later shown in cinemas. Ecumenical memorial services were held in churches and chapels throughout the country, for which a special "form of service" had been printed, to be used "either on the Day of the Funeral or on the Most Convenient Day within the Octave, by His Majesty's Special Command".

Guests
As per report in London Gazette.

British royal family

The House of Windsor

 Queen Mary, the late king's widow
 The King, the late king's son
 The Duke and Duchess of York, the late king's son and daughter-in-law
 The Princess Royal and The Earl of Harewood, the late king's daughter and son-in-law
 Viscount Lascelles, the late king's grandson
 The Hon. Gerald Lascelles, the late king's grandson
 The Duke and Duchess of Gloucester, the late king's son and daughter-in-law
 The Duke and Duchess of Kent, the late king's son and daughter-in-law (also first cousin once removed)
 Princess and Prince Arthur of Connaught, the late king's niece and her husband, the late king's first cousin (representing the Duke of Connaught and Strathearn)
 Earl of Macduff, the late king's great-nephew
 Lady Maud and Lord Carnegie, the late king's niece and nephew-in-law
  The Queen and King of Norway, the late king's sister and brother-in-law (also first cousin)
  The Crown Prince of Norway, the late king's nephew
 Princess Helena Victoria, the late king's first cousin
 Princess Marie Louise, the late king's first cousin
 Lady Patricia Ramsay, the late king's first cousin
 Alexander Ramsay, the late king's first cousin once removed
 The Earl of Athlone and Princess Alice, Countess of Athlone, the late king's brother-in-law and sister-in-law (also the late king's first cousin)
 Lady May and Henry Abel Smith, the late king's niece and nephew-in-law

Teck-Cambridge family

 The Marquess and Marchioness of Cambridge, the late king's nephew and niece-in-law
 Lady Mary Cambridge, the late king's great-niece
 The Duchess and Duke of Beaufort, the late king's niece and nephew-in-law
 Lady Helena Gibbs, the late king's niece
 Lord Frederick Cambridge, the late king's nephew

Mountbatten family

 The Marquess of Carisbrooke, the late king's first cousin
 Lady Iris Mountbatten, the late king's first cousin once removed
 The Dowager Marchioness of Milford Haven, the late king's first cousin
 The Marquess and Marchioness of Milford Haven, the late king's first cousin once removed and his wife
 Lord Louis Mountbatten, the late king's first cousin once removed

Foreign royalty
  The King of Denmark and Iceland, the late king's first cousin
  The Crown Princess of Denmark, the late king's first cousin once removed
  Prince Axel of Denmark, the late king's first cousin
 Queen Victoria Eugenie of Spain, the late king's first cousin
 Infanta Beatrice and Infante Alfonso of Spain, the late king's first cousin and her husband
 Infante Álvaro of Spain, the late king's first cousin once removed
 The Duke and Duchess of Saxe-Coburg and Gotha, the late king's first cousin and his wife
  Prince George of Greece and Denmark, the late king's first cousin
  Prince Nicholas of Greece and Denmark, the late king's first cousin and father of the late king's daughter-in-law
  The Prince Regent of Yugoslavia, husband of the late king's first cousin once removed
  The Crown Prince of Greece, the late king's double first cousin once removed (representing the King of the Hellenes)
  The King of the Romanians, the late king's first cousin once removed
  The Crown Princess and Crown Prince of Sweden, the late king's first cousin once removed and her husband (also widower of the late king's first cousin) (representing the King of Sweden)
 The Hereditary Grand Duke of Hesse, the late king's first cousin once removed
 Prince Ernest Augustus of Hanover, the late king's first cousin once removed
 Grand Duke Dmitri Pavlovich of Russia, the late king's first cousin once removed
 Prince Frederick of Prussia, the late king's first cousin twice removed
  Prince Félix of Luxembourg, husband of the late king's second cousin once removed (representing the Grand Duchess of Luxembourg)
  The King of the Belgians, the late king's third cousin (also widower of the late king's first cousin once removed)
  The Count of Flanders, the late king's third cousin
  The Tsar of Bulgaria, the late king's third cousin
 The Duke of Nemours, the late king's third cousin
  The Prince of Piedmont, husband of the late king's third cousin (representing the King of Italy)
  The Prince of the Sa'id (representing the King of Egypt)
  Prince Zeid bin Hussein (representing the King of Iraq)
  Prince Chula Chakrabongse (representing the King of Siam)
  Prince Salih Doshishti (representing the King of the Albanians)
 The Duke of Braganza
 The Raja of Sawantwadi
 The Maharaja of Dhrangadhra
 Prince Ernst Rüdiger Starhemberg
 Prince Franz of Windisch-Graetz

Other dignitaries
  The President of France
  The Prime Minister of Belgium
  Norman Davis, former United States Under Secretary of State
 The Canadian High Commissioner
 The Australian High Commissioner
 The New Zealand High Commissioner
 The South African High Commissioner
 The Irish High Commissioner

Nobility
 The Duke of Norfolk
 The Duchess of Devonshire
 The Marquess of Anglesey
 The Earl of Cavan
 The Earl of Cork and Orrery
 The Earl Beatty
 The Earl of Lucan
 The Earl of Granard
 The Earl of Shaftesbury
 The Earl of Dunmore
 The Earl of Feversham
 The Earl of Munster
 The Viscount Hampden
 The Viscount Gage
 The Lord Trenchard
 The Lord Milne
 The Lord Elphinstone
 The Lord Templemore
 The Lord Wigram
 The Lord Dawson of Penn
 The Lord Colebrooke
 The Lord Howard of Penrith
 Viscount Lewisham
 Lord Claud Hamilton
 The Hon. Sir Reginald Drax
 The Hon. Sir Francis Gathorne-Hardy
 The Hon. Sir Stanley Colville
 The Hon. Sir George Crichton
 The Hon. Sir Herbert Meade-Fetherstonhaugh
 The Hon. Sir Hubert Brand
 The Hon. Sir Montague Eliot
 The Hon. Sir Piers Legh
 The Hon. Alexander Hardinge

See also
 Death and state funeral of Queen Victoria
 Death and state funeral of Edward VII
 Death and state funeral of George VI
 Death and state funeral of Elizabeth II
 State funerals in the United Kingdom

References

Sources

External links
 Special issue of the Illustrated London News covering King George V's death

George V
1936 in Europe
1936 in the United Kingdom
1930s in the City of Westminster
European court festivities
Events involving British royalty
George V
January 1936 events
George V
Westminster Abbey